Dumitru is a Romanian surname and given name. Notable people with the surname include:

Alina Alexandra Dumitru (born 1982), Romanian judoka
Alexe Dumitru (1935–1971), Romanian sprint canoer
Ion Dumitru (born 1950), Romanian footballer
Nicolao Dumitru (born 1991), Italian footballer
Ted Dumitru (1939–2016), Romanian football manager

Notable people with the given name include:

Dumitru Bâșcu (1902–1983), Romanian painter
Dumitru Berciu (1907–1998), Romanian historian and archaeologist
Dumitru Caracostea (1879–1964), Romanian folklorist, literary historian, and critic
Dumitru Carlaonț (1888–1970), Romanian general
Dumitru Ciotti (1882/1885–1974), Megleno-Romanian activist, editor and schoolteacher
Dumitru Corbea (1910–2002), Romanian writer
Dumitru Cornilescu (1891–1975), Romanian theologian
Dumitru Karnabatt (1877–1949), Romanian poet, art critic, and political journalist
Dumitru C. Moruzi (1850–1914), Moldavian-born Russian and Romanian aristocrat, civil servant, and writer
Dumitru Popovici (1902–1952), Romanian literary historian
Dumitru Sigmirean (1959–2013), Romanian footballer

See also 
 Dumitriu (surname)
 Dumitreni (disambiguation)
 Dumitrescu (surname)
 Dumitra, name of several villages in Romania
 Dumitrești, name of several villages in Romania
 Dumitreștii, name of several villages in Romania

Romanian-language surnames
Romanian masculine given names
Megleno-Romanian masculine given names